Monardella palmeri is a species of flowering plant in the mint family known by the common name Palmer's monardella.

Distribution
Monardella palmeri is endemic to California, where it is known only from the Santa Lucia Mountains of the California Coast Ranges in Monterey and San Luis Obispo Counties. It grows in local habitat types such as chaparral and forest, often on serpentine soils.

Description
Monardella palmeri is a rhizomatous perennial herb forming a tuft of slender, decumbent purplish stems up to about 30 centimeters long. The leathery lance-shaped leaves are 1 to 2 centimeters long.

The inflorescence is a head of several flowers blooming in a cup of leathery purple bracts roughly 3 centimeters wide. The pinkish purple flowers are up to 2 centimeters long with tips divided into five narrow lobes.

References

External links
 Calflora Database: Monardella palmeri (Palmer's monardella)
 Jepson Manual eFlora (TJM2) treatment of Monardella palmeri
 USDA Plants Profile
 Monardella palmeri − Photo gallery

palmeri
Endemic flora of California
Natural history of the California chaparral and woodlands
Natural history of the California Coast Ranges
~
Monterey Ranger District, Los Padres National Forest
Natural history of Monterey County, California
Natural history of San Luis Obispo County, California
Taxa named by Asa Gray
Threatened flora of California